The 1934–35 Rugby Union County Championship was the 42nd edition of England's premier rugby union club competition at the time.

Lancashire won the competition for the second time (the first being in 1891) after defeating Somerset in the final.

Final

See also
 English rugby union system
 Rugby union in England

References

Rugby Union County Championship
County Championship (rugby union) seasons